Khaliq Dina Hall, also spelled Khaliq Deena Hall, is a library and hall located in Karachi, Pakistan. The building was built in 1906, and was after Ghulam Hoosain Khalikdina - a wealthy merchant and philanthropist who was the main financier for the building, and who wished for Karachi's Muslims to have a space for literary pursuits.  It currently has a hall which is used for various events, a library, and a room that serves as the office of a local NGO.

History 
Khaliq Dina Hall and Library was built in 1906, although Khaliqdina's library foundation was established in 1856 as the Native General Library. The building was named after local philanthropist and merchant Ghulam Hussain Khaliqdina, who was instrumental in the establishment of the Sindh Madressatul Islam. Khaliqdina was raised in the Khoja tradition of Shia Islam, but was condemned by the Aga Khan for his involvement with the Twelver branch of Shia Islam, leading him to renounce the Khoja tradition and eventually become a Twelver himself.

In 1902, Khaliqdina donated 18,000 rupees out of the total cost of 33,000 rupees towards construction of the building, while the remaining 15,000 rupees were provided by the Karachi Municipal Corporation. Khaliq Dina Hall was used as the court for the 1921 "Trial of Sedition" in which British authorities put Maulana Shaukat Ali and Maulana Mohammad Ali Jouhar on trial for mutiny as they made speeches in support of the Khilafat Movement.  

On 20 February 1949, the first session of the Pakistan Muslim League Council was held in the hall, and was attended by Pakistan's first Prime Minister, Liaquat Ali Khan. The hall was also used after Pakistan's independence as a site for Majlis during the last ten days of Muharram, which were addressed by the eminent Islamic scholars Allama Rasheed Turabi, Allama Aqeel Turabi and Dr. Kalbe Sadiq 

In 1970, Dada Amir Haider Khan, a Communist activist, gave a speech in the hall. The hall was also used the Pakistan's leftist National Students Federation as a site for their meetings. In 1994, the original roof of the building collapsed in a heavy rainstorm.

Architecture
The hall was designed in a Palladian style, by the Lahore-born Iraqi-Jewish architect Moses Somake.  Its most notable feature is the 10 foot wide veranda and triangular pediment supported by 12 Greek-style Ionic pillars at the front, which makes the building resemble an ancient Greek temple. The pediment is inscribed with the name of the building, and date of construction - Ghulam Hoosain Khalikdina Hall and Library 1906. 

The building's exterior measures 525 by 325 feet, while the interior hall is 95 feet in length and 45 feet wide. The interior ceiling height is 30 feet. The main hall can seat approximately 600 persons. The original pitched roof was made of teak wood, which collapsed in a heavy rainstorm in 1994.

Conservation 
The hall was renovated in 1959 before an address there by President Ayub Khan. Restoration of the collapsed roof began in 1996. It was again restored in 2002 by the Karachi Metropolitan Corporation at a cost of Rupees 15 million. This building is now protected as a Cultural Heritage Sites of Sindh.

See also
 List of cultural heritage sites in Sindh (A detailed list with pictures)

References

External links 

 Khalikdina Hall Library a listing of libraries from Pakistan Library Network, maintained by PLANWEL

Buildings and structures in Karachi
Libraries in Karachi
Heritage sites in Karachi
Monuments and memorials in Pakistan